Kuo Mei-chiang (1953 – 4 August 2020) was a Taiwanese pastor. In the past she served in the CRC Lihebo Church of Hongkong and most recently the Taipei Pure Gospel Church. Her statements and teachings were discussed online, and she became known as MC Mei-chiang.

Kuo died in Linkou Chang Gung Memorial Hospital on 4 August 2020.

References

Women Christian religious leaders
Taiwanese Christian clergy
Taiwanese women
1953 births
2020 deaths
Place of birth missing